Susanne Katharina Seiffart von Klettenberg (19 December 1723 – 16 December 1774) was a German abbess and writer. She was a friend of Catharina Elisabeth Goethe, the mother of writer Johann Wolfgang von Goethe. Klettenberg corresponded with Goethe, and he shaped a character, "Beautiful Soul," after her in his novel Wilhelm Meister's Apprenticeship. She was also a friend of Friedrich Christoph Steinhofer (1706–1761), a former co-episcopus of the Moravian Church.

References

1723 births
1774 deaths
German women philosophers
German spiritual writers
German women writers
German artists
German philosophers
Women religious writers
18th-century German women writers